Vilar may refer to:

People
Vilar (surname)

Places in Portugal

Vilar (Boticas), a parish in the municipality of Boticas
Vilar (Cadaval), a parish in the municipality of Cadaval 
Vilar (Moimenta da Beira), a parish in the municipality of Moimenta da Beira
Vilar (Terras de Bouro), a parish in the municipality of Terras de Bouro 
Vilar (Vila do Conde), a parish in the municipality of Vila do Conde
Areias de Vilar, a parish in the municipality of Barcelos
Vilar Barroco, a parish in the municipality of Oleiros
Vilar da Veiga, a parish in the municipality of Alfândega da Fé
Vilar das Almas, a parish in the municipality of Vieira do Minho
Vilar de Amargo, a parish in the municipality of Terras de Bouro 
Vilar de Andorinho, a parish in the municipality of Ponte de Lima
Vilar de Besteiros, a parish in the municipality of Figueira de Castelo Rodrigo 
Vilar Chão (Alfândega da Fé), a parish in the municipality of Vila Nova de Gaia
Vilar Chão (Vieira do Minho), a parish in the municipality of Tondela
Vilar de Cunhas, a parish in the municipality of Cabeceiras de Basto
Vilar de Ferreiros, a parish in the municipality of Mondim de Basto
Vilar de Figos, a parish in the municipality of Barcelos
Vilar de Lomba, a parish in the municipality of Vinhais
Vilar de Maçada, a parish in the municipality of Alijó
Vilar de Mouros, a parish in the municipality of Caminha
Vilar de Murteda, a parish in Viana do Castelo Municipality
Vilar de Ossos, a parish in the municipality of Vinhais 
Vilar de Perdizes, a parish in the municipality of Montalegre
Vilar de Peregrinos, a parish in the municipality of Vinhais 
Vilar de Pinheiro, a parish in the municipality of Vila do Conde
Vilar de Rei, a parish in the municipality of Mogadouro
Vilar do Monte (Barcelos), a parish in the municipality of Barcelos
Vilar do Monte (Macedo de Cavaleiros), a parish in the municipality of Macedo de Cavaleiros
Vilar do Monte (Ponte de Lima), a parish in the municipality of Ponte de Lima
Vilar do Paraíso, a parish in the municipality of Vila Nova de Gaia
Vilar do Torno e Alentém, a parish in the municipality of Lousada
Vilar Formoso, a parish in the municipality of Almeida
Vilar Maior, a parish in the municipality of Sabugal
Vilar Seco (Nelas), a parish in the municipality of Nelas
Vilar Seco (Vimioso), a parish in the municipality of Vimioso
Vilar Seco de Lomba, a parish in the municipality of Vinhais
Vilar Torpim, a parish in the municipality of Figueira de Castelo Rodrigo

Other
 VILAR Botanical Garden (Moscow)

See also
Vilarinho (disambiguation)
Velar (disambiguation)